.mw is the Internet country code top-level domain (ccTLD) for Malawi. After initial delegation, in 2002 the IANA recommended that administration of the ccTLD be transferred to the Malawi Sustainable Development Network Programme from Computer Solutions Ltd. The recommendation was implemented.

Prices for .mw domains are US$100 for the first two years, followed by $50 per year thereafter.

Second-level domains
In addition to registrations directly at the second level, it is also possible to register third-level names beneath these names. For the most part, the descriptions of the types of organizations each domain is for are advisory, and are not enforced.
 ac.mw – academic institutions
 co.mw – commercial organisations
 com.mw – an alternative for commercial organisations
 coop.mw – cooperative associations
 edu.mw – degree-granting academic institutions
 gov.mw – restricted to government
 int.mw – international treaty organisations
 museum.mw – museums, historical, documentation or display organisations
 net.mw – networking organisations
 org.mw – non-profit organisations

External links
 IANA .mw whois information
 .mw domain registration website
 nic.mw

References

Country code top-level domains
Communications in Malawi
Internet in Malawi

sv:Toppdomän#M